Amaranthus polygonoides is a species of flowering plant found in North America and the Caribbean. It goes by the common name of tropical amaranth.

References

polygonoides